Dov Hoz (September 19, 1894 - December 29, 1940) was a leader of the Labor Zionism movement, one of the founders of the Haganah organization, and a pioneer of Israeli aviation.

Biography
Born in Orsha, Russian Empire, in 1894, Hoz immigrated to Ottoman Palestine as a child along with his family in 1906. Beginning in 1909, he was part of the group that organized guarding activity of the city of Tel-Aviv. The group included Shaul Meirov-Avigur, Eliyahu Golomb and Moshe Sharett. During World War I, Hoz volunteered for service in the Turkish army and was sentenced to death for continuing activities to secure the Jewish settlement of Palestine. He escaped death by fleeing to the south of Palestine which had just been conquered by the British.

Hoz was one of the organizers of the Jewish Legion. From 1920 to 1930, he was a member of the central Haganah committee. From 1931 to 1940, he was a member of the national Haganah command center. He went on to become one of the heads of the labor movement and a founding member of the socialist Ahdut HaAvoda party. In 1935 he was appointed vice-mayor of Tel-Aviv, and later head of the state department of the Histadrut (Labor Federation).

Hoz died in a car accident in December 1940. He was on his way to an Aviron board meeting. He was traveling with his wife Rivka (sister of Moshe Sharett, who later became Israel's second prime minister) and his daughter Tirza. Also in the car were his sister-in-law Tzvia Sharett and Aviron co-founder Yitzhak Ben-Ya'akov. They all lost their lives in the fatal accident.

Aviation
Hoz and Yitzhak Ben Ya'akov from Degania Alef were the founders of Aviron Aviation Company, for which Hoz acted as CEO. Aviron was one of a handful of aviation pioneering enterprises of the Yishuv, created with its foreseeable security needs in mind. It trained pilots and  established flight lines in Mandatory Palestine and outside, while serving as cover for the budding, tiny and illegal "air force" of the Yishuv, eventually organised between 1945 and 10 November 1947 as Palmach's Palavir, and then until Independence as the Haganah's Sherut Avir.

Legacy and commemoration
One year after Hoz's death, on Hanukkah 1941, Kibbutz Dorot was established in the Negev by German Jewish refugees. They dedicated their new home to the memory of the Hoz family. (Dorot is an acronym formed by the first letters of the names Dov, Rivka and Tirza.) Many national and local institutions and streets throughout Israel have been named in memory of Dov Hoz in the years since his tragic death. Former Tel Aviv's city airport, Sde Dov Airport, was also named after him.

References

1894 births
1940 deaths
Haganah members
Ashkenazi Jews in Mandatory Palestine
Ashkenazi Jews in Ottoman Palestine
Jews from the Russian Empire
Emigrants from the Russian Empire to the Ottoman Empire
People from Orsha
Ahdut HaAvoda politicians
Road incident deaths in Mandatory Palestine
Burials at Trumpeldor Cemetery